Chaudhry Hussain Ellahi is a Pakistani politician who has been a member of the National Assembly of Pakistan since August 2018. He is the elder son of the former federal minister of Pakistan Chaudhry Wajahat Hussain. He is the current member of Pakistan Tehreek e Insaf.

Political career
He was elected to the National Assembly of Pakistan as a candidate of Pakistan Muslim League (Q) (PML-Q) from constituency NA-68 (Gujrat-I) in 2018 Pakistani general election.

However, Chaudhary Hussain Elahi announced his resignation from PML-Q on 10 June 2022.

References

Living people
 Pakistani MNAs 2018–2023
 Chaudhry family
 Year of birth missing (living people)